Župa Dubrovačka is a municipality and a valley located in Dubrovnik-Neretva County in south-eastern Croatia. It has 8,331 inhabitants, 93% of which are Croats.
 
Župa Dubrovačka stretches between Dubrovnik, the old Ragusa in the west and Cavtat, the ancient Epidaurus in the east, between the settlements of Dubac and Plat. The three islands Supetar, Mrkan and Bobara anchored right in front of the bay protect it from the open sea and from the north the hilly slopes of the Upper Župa. Tourist resorts are clustered along the coast. 

Župa Dubrovačka is underdeveloped municipality which is statistically classified as the First Category Area of Special State Concern by the Government of Croatia.

References

Populated places in Dubrovnik-Neretva County
Municipalities of Croatia